Ibacus is a genus of slipper lobsters, including commercially important species such as the Balmain bug, Ibacus peronii.

References

Achelata